Peter Voulkos (born Panagiotis Harry Voulkos; 29 January 1924 – 16 February 2002) was an American artist of Greek descent. He is known for his abstract expressionist ceramic sculptures, which crossed the traditional divide between ceramic crafts and fine art. He established the ceramics department at the Los Angeles County Art Institute and at UC Berkeley.

Biography

Early life
Peter Voulkos was born the third of five children to Greek immigrant parents, Aristovoulos I. Voulkopoulos, anglicized and shortened to Harry (Aris) John Voulkos and Effrosyni (Efrosine) Peter Voulalas.

After high school, he worked as a molder's apprentice at a ship's foundry in Portland. In 1943, Peter Voulkos was drafted into the United States Army during the Second World War, serving as an airplane gunner in the Pacific.

Ceramics' specialization
Voulkos studied painting and printmaking at Montana State College, in Bozeman (now Montana State University), where he was introduced to ceramics (Frances Senska, who established the ceramics arts program, was his teacher). Ceramics quickly became a passion. His 25 pounds of clay allowed by semester by the school was not enough, so he managed to spot a source of quality clay from the tires of the trucks that would stop by the restaurant where he worked part-time.

He earned his MFA in ceramics from California College of the Arts and Crafts, in Oakland. Afterwards, he returned to Bozeman, and began his career in a pottery business with classmate Rudy Autio, producing functional dinnerware.

In 1951 Voulkos and Autio became the first resident artists at the Archie Bray Foundation for the Ceramic Arts, in Helena, Montana. It is from his time as Resident Director (1951-1954) that the lineage of his mature work, later in full bloom during his tenure at the Otis Art Institute in Los Angeles, California, can be traced.

In 1953, Voulkos was invited to teach a summer session ceramics course at Black Mountain College in Asheville, North Carolina. After the summer at Black Mountain, he changed his approach to creating ceramics. The artist eschewed his traditional training and instead of creating smooth, well-thrown glazed vessels he started to work gesturally with raw clay, frequently marring his work with gashes and punctures.

In 1954, after founding the art ceramics department at the Otis College of Art and Design, called the Los Angeles County Art Institute, his work rapidly became abstract and sculptural. In 1959, he presented for the first time his heavy ceramics during the exhibition at the Landau Gallery in Los Angeles. This created a seismic reaction in the ceramics world, both for the grotesquerie of the sculptures' shapes and the genius marriage of arts and craft, and accelerated his transfer to UC Berkeley.

UC Berkeley's ceramics department
He moved to the University of California, Berkeley, in 1959, where he also founded the ceramics program, which grew into the Department of Design. In the early 1960s, he set up a bronze foundry off-campus, anticipating the metal cast Wurster Hall, and started exhibiting his work at NY's Museum of Modern Art.

He became a full professor there in 1967, and continued to teach until 1985. Among his students were many ceramic artists who became well known in their own right.

At a New York auction in 2001, a 1986 sculpture by Peter Voulkos was sold $72,625 to a European museum.

He died of a heart attack on February 16, 2002, after conducting a college ceramics workshop at Bowling Green State University, Ohio, demonstrating his skill to a live audience.

Work

Description
While his early work was fired in electric and gas kilns, later in his career he primarily fired in the anagama kiln of Peter Callas, who had helped to introduce Japanese wood-firing aesthetics in the United States. Peter Voulkos is also among those who raised ceramics to the non-utilitarian, aesthetic sphere. While setting up the ceramics department at UC Berkeley, his students were authorized to make a teapot, "only if it didn't work". Voulkos started this new trend while in Los Angeles in the 1950s, saying, "there was a certain energy around L.A. at the time". He is most commonly identified as an Abstract Expressionist ceramist.

Voulkos's sculptures are known for their visual weight, their freely-formed construction, and their aggressive and energetic decoration. During shaping, he would vigorously tear, pound, and gouge their surfaces. At some points in his career, he cast sculptures in bronze; and in early periods his ceramic works were glazed or painted and/or finished with painted brushstrokes.

Peter Voulkos is also memorable for the live ceramics-sculpting sessions he would lead in front of his students, demonstrating his intense and even unforgiving manner of working with the material, while simultaneously showcasing his refined mastery of the nuances of the craft. His creativity quest sometimes led to the use of commercial dough-mixing machines to mix the clay, and the development of a prototype for an electric potter's wheel.

In 1979 he was introduced to the use of wood firing in anagama kilns by Peter Callas, who became a close collaborator of his for the next 23 years. Most of Voulkos's late work was wood-fired in Callas's anagama, which was located at first in Piermont, New York, and later, in Belvidere, New Jersey. This unique partnership and the resulting work is considered by many curators and collectors to be the most exuberant period of Voulkos's career .

Sculptures
Black Butte Divide or Black Divide - Butte, 1958, fired clay, Norton Simon Museum
Hall of justice, 1971, bronze
Mr. Ishi, 1970, bronze
Untitled (Stack), 1980, stoneware, exhibited at the Oakland Museum of California

Public collections

Awards
1959: Rodin Museum Prize
1984: Guggenheim Fellowship
1997: Distinguished Artist Award for Lifetime Achievement from the College Art Association

Personal life
Voulkos is survived by his first wife, Margaret Cone, and their daughter, Pier, a polymer clay artist; his wife, Ann, and their son, Aris; and his brother and two sisters.

In the early 1980s, Peter Voulkos went to rehab to deal with alcohol and cocaine addiction.

See also 
 American craft
 Ceramics (art)
 Studio pottery
 Paul Soldner

References

Further reading 
 Rhodes, Daniel (1959). Stoneware and Porcelain: The Art of High-Fired Pottery. Philadelphia: Chilton Book Company, Pennsylvania, 1959.
 Coplans, John (1966). Abstract Expressionist Ceramics (exhibition catalogue). The University of California, Irvine, 1966.
 Read, Herbert (1964). A Concise History of Modern Sculpture.  New York: Oxford University Press, New York.
 Beard, Geoffrey (1969). Modern Ceramics London: Studio Vista, United Kingdom, 1969.
 Fischer, Hal (November 1978). "The Art of Peter Voulkos", Artforum, pp. 41–47.
 Slivka, Rose (1978). Peter Voulkos: A Dialogue with Clay. New York: New York Graphic Society in association with American Crafts Council.
San Francisco Museum of Modern Art (1978). Peter Voulkos: A Retrospective 1948-1978. San Francisco, California.
 Preaud, Tamara and Serge Gauthier (1982). Ceramics of the 20th Century. New York: Rizzoli International.
 MacNaughton, Mary et al. (1994). Revolution in Clay: The Marer Collection of Contemporary Ceramics. Scripps College, Claremont, California, in association with The University of Washington, Seattle.
 Slivka, Rose and Karen Tsujimoto (1995). The Art of Peter Voulkos. Kodansha International in collaboration with the Oakland Museum, Oakland, California.
 Danto, Arthur Coleman and Janet Koplos (1999). Choice from America: Modern American Ceramics. 's-Hertogenbosch, Netherlands: Het Kruithuis, Museum of Contemporary Art. pp. 9–12, 16-9, 104-7, 133.
 The American Art Book (1999). London: Phaidon Press Limited.  p. 467.
 Cooper, Emmanuel (2000). Ten Thousand Years of Pottery. 4th ed. Philadelphia, PA: University of Pennsylvania Press.
 Faberman, Hilarie, et al. (2004).Picasso to Thiebaud: Modern and Contemporary Art from the Collections of Stanford University Alumni and Friends. Palo Alto, California: Iris & B. Gerald Cantor Center for Visual Arts, Stanford University.

External links 
Voulkos & Co. web site
Artist's page at Frank Lloyd Gallery
Chronology on Artnet.com

1924 births
2002 deaths
20th-century ceramists
21st-century ceramists
20th-century American sculptors
20th-century American male artists
21st-century American sculptors
21st-century American male artists
American potters
American ceramists
Sculptors from California
Modern sculptors
American people of Greek descent
People from Bozeman, Montana
California College of the Arts alumni
Artists from the San Francisco Bay Area
Otis College of Art and Design faculty
Artists from Montana
Montana State University alumni
American male sculptors
Black Mountain College faculty
United States Army Air Forces personnel of World War II
United States Army Air Forces soldiers